Tiit Tikerpe (born September 7, 1965 in Tartu) is an Estonian sprint canoer who competed in the early 1990s. At the 1992 Summer Olympics in Barcelona, he was eliminated in the semifinals of the C-1 500 m event while being disqualified in the semifinals of the C-1 1000 m event.

References
 Sports-Reference.com profile

1965 births
Canoeists at the 1992 Summer Olympics
Estonian male canoeists
Living people
Olympic canoeists of Estonia
Sportspeople from Tartu